Manuka Bay is located on the North Canterbury coast, northeast of the Hurunui River in the South Island of  New Zealand. It is near Napenape and the town of Cheviot.

The area is a popular destination for people who are travelling from coast to coast. It has no toilets and camping is not permitted. It has no stores or gas stations.

References

External links
 Map

Bays of Canterbury, New Zealand